The 1968 United States Senate election in Idaho took place on Tuesday, November 5. Democratic incumbent Frank Church was re-elected to a third term in office, defeating Republican U.S. Representative George V. Hansen.

General election

Results

See also 
 1968 United States Senate elections

References

1968
Idaho
United States Senate